Catapaecilma is a genus of butterflies in the family Lycaenidae. The species of this genus are found in the Indomalayan realm.

Species (9)
 Catapaecilma elegans (Druce, 1873)
 Catapaecilma evansi Pendlebury, 1933 (Peninsular Malaya, Nias)
 Catapaecilma gracilis Semper, [1890] (Philippines)
 Catapaecilma harmani Cassidy, 1982 (Borneo, Brunei)
 Catapaecilma lila Eliot, 1967 (Peninsular Malaya)
 Catapaecilma major Druce, 1895 (India, Ceylon, Burma, Thailand, Laos, Peninsular Malaya, Singapore, Taiwan, northeast Sumatra, West Java)
 Catapaecilma nakamotoi Hayashi, 1979
 Catapaecilma nuydai Takanami, 1988 (Philippines, Mindanao, Mount Kitanglad)
 Catapaecilma subochrea Elwes, [1893] (Burma (Naga Hills to Dawei), Malaya, Thailand)

References

External links
"Catapaecilma Butler, 1879" at Markku Savela's Lepidoptera and Some Other Life Forms

 
Catapaecilmatini
Lycaenidae genera
Taxa named by Arthur Gardiner Butler